Gillermo Fabrisco Faerber (born 15 April 1992) is a Surinamese professional footballer who plays as a centre-back for SVB Eerste Divisie club Bintang Lahir. A former international, he played in the 2011 CONCACAF U-20 Championship and its qualifiers for the Suriname national team.

References

External links
 
 
 
 Gillermo Faerber  at WorldFootball.com

1992 births
Living people
Surinamese footballers
Sportspeople from Paramaribo
Suriname international footballers
Suriname under-20 international footballers
Association football defenders
S.V. Leo Victor players
S.V. Transvaal players
S.C.V. Bintang Lahir players
SVB Eerste Divisie players